Abuná is one of the five provinces of the Bolivian department of Pando and is situated in the department's northern central parts. It has its name from Río Abuná, the border river to neighbouring Brazil.

Location 
Aroma province is located between 9° 53' and 11° 06' South and between 66° 27' and 67° 42' West. It extends over 120–250 km from North to South, and 350 km from West to East.

The province is situated in the Amazon lowlands of Bolivia and borders Brazil in the North, Nicolás Suárez Province in the Northwest and West, Manuripi Province in the South, and Federico Román Province in the East.

Population 
The population of Abuná Province has increased by 40% over the recent two decades:
1992: 2,652 inhabitants (census)
2001: 2,996 inhabitants (census)
2005: 3,475 inhabitants (est.)
2010: 3,729 inhabitants (est.)

 45.4% of the population are younger than 15 years old. (1992)

 52.3% of the population speak Spanish, 2.8% speak Aymara, 2.0% Quechua, and 52.8 speak other indigenous languages. (1992)

The literacy rate of the province's population is 47.4%. (1992)

 87.6% of the population have no access to electricity, 83.6% have no sanitary facilities. (1992)

 83.5% of the population are Catholics, 15.4% are Protestants. (1992)

Division 
The province comprises two municipios:
Santa Rosa del Abuná Municipality - 3,090 km2 - 2,097 inhabitants (2001)
Ingavi Municipality - 4,378 km2 - 899 inhabitants (2001)

References

External links 
General map of province
Detailed map of province towns and rivers
Population data (Spanish)
Social data (Spanish)

Provinces of Pando Department